Park Eun-jin (born 15 December 1999) is a South Korean volleyball player. She competed in the 2020 Summer Olympics.

References

1999 births
Living people
People from Sacheon
Volleyball players at the 2020 Summer Olympics
South Korean women's volleyball players
Olympic volleyball players of South Korea
Asian Games medalists in volleyball
Sportspeople from South Gyeongsang Province